Aleksandrs Viļumanis (30 August 1942, Preiļi, Reichskommissariat Ostland) is a Latvian conductor.

Vilumanis studied percussion and conducting at the Latvian Academy of Music, being hired 1962 as a percussionist and conductor's assistant at the Latvian National Opera. His musical career has been based at the Latvian National Opera, first as intern 1962–69, conductor 1970–72, principal conductor 1975–89 and 1994–96, alternating with the Mariinsky Opera and Ballet Theatre; intern conductor 1972–75 and principal conductor 1990–94. He is currently guest conductor at the Latvian National Opera, Mariinsky Theatre and Bolshoi Theatre.

Selected Recordings
LP/CD
 Alfrēds Kalniņš Banuta - Latvia's national opera
 Inessa Galante Debut 1995
VHS/DVD
 Prokofiev's The Stone Flower Kirov Ballet NVC DVD
 Delibes's Coppelia Kirov Ballet NVC - Grammophon

References

1942 births
Living people
People from Preiļi
Latvian conductors (music)
Male conductors (music)
Latvian Academy of Music alumni
21st-century conductors (music)
21st-century male musicians